Mahakali is a municipality located in Darchula District of Sudurpashchim Province of Nepal.

The municipality was established on 18 May 2014 named  "Api Municipality" merging the former village development committees of: Brahmadev, Chhapari, Dhap, Kante and Khalanga. The total area of "Api municipality" had  and it had total population of 20,797 people.

Fulfilling the requirement of the new Constitution of Nepal 2015, all old municipalities and villages (which were more than 3900 in number) were restructured into 753 new units, thus this municipality upgraded into Mahakali municipality

On 10 March 2017, during upgradation of Api municipality a small portion of this municipality (ward 1, 2 & 3) excluded from it and Dattu Village development committee merged to it and renamed as Mahakali municipality. Now total area of the municipality has  and total population of it is 21231 people, the municipality is divided into total 9 wards.

References

Municipalities in Darchula District
Nepal municipalities established in 2014
Populated places in Darchula District
Darchula District